Carlos Sánchez-Gutiérrez (born 1964 in Mexico City, Mexico) is a Latin-American composer and teacher.  He currently resides near Rochester, New York.

Sanchez-Gutierrez grew up in Guadalajara and later studied at the University of Guadalajara, the Peabody Conservatory of Music, Yale University, Princeton University, and the Tanglewood Music Center with Henri Dutilleux, Jacob Druckman, and Martin Bresnick.

Sanchez-Gutierrez was a recipient of the Mozart Medal in 1993. He has also received awards from the Guggenheim, Fulbright, Fromm, Barlow, Rockefeller, Bogliasco and Koussevitzky Foundations. His compositional catalog includes works for orchestra, chamber ensembles, choirs, and soloists, and often reflects on contemporary art and literature.

Sanchez-Gutierrez is currently Professor of Composition at the Eastman School of Music in Rochester, New York, a position he has held since July 2003.  From 1995 to 2003, Sanchez-Gutierrez served on the faculty of San Francisco State University, where he taught courses in music theory and composition.  In 2002, he was Guest Professor of Composition at Yale University.

External links
Carlos Sanchez-Gutierrez official site

1964 births
Living people
American male classical composers
American classical composers
20th-century classical composers
21st-century classical composers
University of Rochester faculty
Pupils of Jacob Druckman
21st-century American composers
Musicians from Baltimore
Peabody Institute alumni
20th-century American composers
20th-century American male musicians
21st-century American male musicians